Monica Rahanitraniriana is a Malagasy Olympic sprinter. She represented her country in the Women's 4 × 100 metres relay at the 2000 Summer Olympics. Her team's time in the qualifiers was a 43.61, followed by a 43.98 in the semifinals.

References

1970 births
Living people
Malagasy female sprinters
Olympic athletes of Madagascar
Athletes (track and field) at the 2000 Summer Olympics
Olympic female sprinters